Brian T. Skala (born March 29, 1981) is an American actor. He is known for playing the lead role, Dylan Roberts, on the NBC series Just Deal. He has guest starred on Boston Public, JAG, Without a Trace, Gilmore Girls, Supernatural, Heroes and FlashForward. He also co-starred in the film The Basket (1999) opposite Peter Coyote and Karen Allen and The Challenge with Mary-Kate and Ashley Olsen.

Filmography

References

External links
 www.BrianTSkala.com

1981 births
Living people
Male actors from Colorado
American male film actors
American male television actors
Male actors from Boulder, Colorado